Ziya Meral is a UK based Turkish-British researcher and advisor. He specialises on global trends shaping defence and security, politics and foreign policies of Turkey and the Middle East, religion and violent conflict issues. He is a senior resident fellow at the UK Army's think-tank, the Centre for Historical Analysis and Conflict Research (CHACR) based at the Royal Military Academy Sandhurst and a senior associate fellow at the Royal United Services Institute. He was the founding director of the Centre on Religion and Global Affairs- a London, Accra and Beirut based initiative exploring impact of religions on global developments. He regularly gives talks, lectures and expert statements at leading academic, political, military and diplomatic institutions and conferences, including the UK House of Commons and House of Lords,  the U.S. Congress, US State Department, NATO Defence College, EU Commission, UK FCDO and MoD and US Military Academy West Point. During 2010–2011, he was a Joseph Crapa Fellow at the US Commission on International Religious Freedom (USCIRF)- a federal body that produces policy proposals for the US government, researching on prevention of ethno-religious violence. He is the co-lead of the Climate Change and (In)Security project, a joint initiative of CHACR and Reuben College, University of Oxford. He is a Council Member of the British Institute at Ankara.

Education 

He holds a 1st Class BA Hons from Brunel University in London, M.Div. from International School of Theology in the Philippines, MSc in sociology from the London School of Economics and a Ph.D. in political science at the University of Cambridge.

Media 

He is a frequent commentator in international and British media, including live interviews on Al Jazeera, BBC World, France 24; BBC World Service radio programs including Europe Today, BBC Radio's the Today Programme. He has been cited by various British and international newspapers on developments in Turkey and Middle East, including the New York Times, the Financial Times, the Atlantic, the Sunday Times, the Daily Telegraph.

References 

British Christians
Turkish Christians
Living people
Turkish economists
Turkish political scientists
Turkish emigrants to the United Kingdom
Year of birth missing (living people)